The International Prize (French: Prix International) of the Fyssen Foundation is a science award that has been given annually since 1980 to a scientist who has conducted distinguished research in the areas supported by the foundation such as ethology, palaeontology, archaeology, anthropology, psychology, epistemology, logic and the neurosciences.

List of awardees 
The following persons have received the International Prize:

References 

French science and technology awards